This is the list of cathedrals in Costa Rica sorted by denomination.

Roman Catholic 
Cathedrals of the Roman Catholic Church in Costa Rica:
Cathedral of Our Lady of the Pillar in Alajuela
Cathedral of Our Lady of Carmel in Cartago
Cathedral of St. Charles Borromeo in Ciudad Quesada
Cathedral of the Sacred Heart of Jesus in Limón
Cathedral of Our Lady of Mount Carmel in Puntarenas
Cathedral of St. Isidore in San Isidro de Pérez Zeledón
Metropolitan Cathedral of St. Joseph in San Jose
 Cathedral of Tilarán
Co-Cathedral of the Immaculate Conception in Liberia

See also
Lists of cathedrals

References

 02
Costa Rica
Cathedrals
Costa Rica
Cathedrals